Solidago fistulosa, the pine barren goldenrod, is a plant species native to low-lying coastal areas of eastern North America. It grows in every state bordering on the Gulf of Mexico or on the Atlantic Ocean from Louisiana to New Jersey. It is generally found in bogs, along the edges of marshes, in drainage ditches, etc.

Solidago fistulosa is an herb up to 150 cm (5 feet) tall, spreading by underground rhizomes. It has winged petioles, broad leaf blades, and sometimes as many as 500 small yellow flower heads born in large branching arrays.

References

fistulosa
Flora of the Eastern United States
Plants described in 1768
Taxa named by Philip Miller